St. Charles Borromeo School is a private Catholic school in Destrehan, Louisiana. It serves students from Pre-kindergarten to eighth grade.

History
In 1929, an elementary school and was built on the grounds of the St. Charles Borromeo Church. It was the first parochial school opened between New Orleans, Louisiana and Baton Rouge, Louisiana and was operated by the Sisters of the Congregation of the Immaculate Conception. In 1948, a parochial high school, St. Charles Borromeo High School, opened on the site.

In 1960, the Sisters of the Most Holy Sacrament took over operation of the schools and in 1978 the high school closed and moved to LaPlace, Louisiana becoming St. Charles Catholic High School. 

St. Charles Borromeo School is still located on the site of St. Charles Borromeo Church.

Campus
The school is located on the 17 acre grounds of St. Charles Borromeo Church in Destrehan, Louisiana.

Extracurricular activities
Student groups and activities include Academic Games, Student Council, Jr. Beta Club, choir, PK - 7th grade cheerleading, competition cheerleading, Spanish, art, Brown Foundation Service Learning, Missoula, drumline,
and both boys and girls varsity and junior varsity sports.

See also
List of schools in the Roman Catholic Archdiocese of New Orleans
St. Charles Borromeo Church (Destrehan, Louisiana)
St. Charles Parish, Louisiana
Saint Charles Borromeo

References

External links
St. Charles Borromeo School

Private elementary schools in Louisiana
Private middle schools in Louisiana
Roman Catholic Archdiocese of New Orleans
Catholic elementary schools in Louisiana
Schools in St. Charles Parish, Louisiana